Kwame Awuah (born December 2, 1995) is a Canadian professional soccer player who currently plays for Loudoun United FC in the USL Championship.

Club career

Early career
Awuah played for the Club Uruguary Toronto, Woodbridge Strikers, the Ontario provincial program and the Dante Alighieri varsity boys soccer team, for which he was elected MVP. In 2013, he graduated from the Sigma FC Academy program.

Awuah then played for the UConn Huskies where he played as a left back, a center midfielder, and a left winger. He won many awards during his time there, including being selected to the American Athletic Conference First Team multiple times.

Sigma FC
In 2014, Awuah signed with his youth club, Sigma FC, which had just joined League1 Ontario, where he played alongside Cyle Larin and Richie Laryea. In 2016, Awuah made six appearances for Sigma and was named to the League1 Ontario Western Conference All-Star Team.

New York City FC
Awuah was called up to the MLS Combine in 2017 and was subsequently drafted in the first round of the 2017 MLS SuperDraft, sixteenth overall, by New York City FC. He signed a contract with the team on March 10. He then made his debut for New York on May 7, 2017 in a win against Atlanta United FC. Upon conclusion of the 2017 season, New York City FC announced they would exercise Awuah's option for the 2018 season. After two seasons with New York City, Awuah was released at the end of the 2018 season.

Forge FC
On January 29, 2019, Awuah signed with Canadian Premier League club Forge FC, reuniting with former coach Bobby Smyrniotis. In the 2019 Canadian Premier League season, Forge finished in second place in both the spring season and the fall season, qualifying for the finals where they faced Cavalry FC. Forge won 1-0 in both legs for a 2-0 aggregate victory, making them the first ever Canadian Premier League champions. Awuah had five assists throughout the season, tied for first in the league with five other players.

He scored his first goal for the club on August 16, 2020 against FC Edmonton. 2020 was another successful year as Forge became CPL champions for the second time.

Awuah again played a key part in Forge's 2021 campaign, gaining acclaim for his passing and defensive skills. However, Forge came just short of a third consecutive league championship, losing in the final to Pacific FC.

St. Louis City SC 2
In January 2022, Awuah trialed with Major League Soccer club Vancouver Whitecaps FC. However, he did not end up signing with the club and instead later joined St. Louis City SC 2 for the team's inaugural season in the newly formed MLS Next Pro.

International career
Awuah was called up to the Canada U23s by new national team manager Octavio Zambrano in March 2017 for some friendlies. Zambrano then called him up to the senior team on May 6, 2017 for a camp and the provisional squad for the 2017 CONCACAF Gold Cup.

Honours

Club
Forge FC
Canadian Premier League: 2019, 2020

References

External links

Connecticut Huskies profile

1995 births
Living people
Association football midfielders
Canadian soccer players
Soccer players from Toronto
Black Canadian soccer players
Canadian people of Ghanaian descent
Canadian expatriate soccer players
Expatriate soccer players in the United States
Canadian expatriate sportspeople in the United States
UConn Huskies men's soccer players
New York City FC draft picks
New York City FC players
Forge FC players
Loudoun United FC players
League1 Ontario players
Major League Soccer players
Canadian Premier League players
Canada men's under-23 international soccer players
Sigma FC players
MLS Next Pro players